The Marked Tree Commercial Historic District encompasses the historic commercial center of Marked Tree, Arkansas.  It includes one city block of Frisco Street, between Nathan and Elm Streets, as well as two adjoining buildings on Elm Street.  This area was developed commercially beginning with the arrival of the railroad in the 1880s, and was focused around the railroad depot, which no longer stands.  All of the fifteen buildings in the district were built between 1910 and 1937, and exhibit typical early 20th-century commercial architecture, mostly executed in brick.

The district was listed on the National Register of Historic Places in 2009.

See also
National Register of Historic Places listings in Poinsett County, Arkansas

References

Neoclassical architecture in Arkansas
Buildings designated early commercial in the National Register of Historic Places in Arkansas
Buildings and structures completed in 1910
Buildings and structures in Poinsett County, Arkansas
Historic districts on the National Register of Historic Places in Arkansas
National Register of Historic Places in Poinsett County, Arkansas